Patraeus may refer to:

 Patraus, an ancient Paeonian king
 David Petraeus, an American general and politician
 Patraeus (city), an ancient Greek colony at the Black Sea, near the modern village of Garkusha, Russia.